The Brice Apartments, located at 228 2nd Ave. E. in Kalispell, Montana, were built in 1936.  They were listed on the National Register of Historic Places in 1994.

They were designed by architect Fred Brinkman and built by contractor B. Brice Gilliland in the Starved Classical architecture style.  Gilliland built them "for his daughter Gussie to manage for income after her retirement from teaching."  The complex is "the only surviving brick apartment house built in Kalispell during the pre-World War II period."

References

Residential buildings on the National Register of Historic Places in Montana
Residential buildings completed in 1936
National Register of Historic Places in Flathead County, Montana
1936 establishments in Montana
Stripped Classical architecture in the United States
Kalispell, Montana